Darnall is a town in Ilembe District Municipality in the KwaZulu-Natal province of South Africa. Darnall is home to the Darnall sugar factory.

References

Populated places in the KwaDukuza Local Municipality